The Division of Holt is an Australian Electoral Division in Victoria. It is located in the outer south-eastern suburbs of Melbourne, including Blind Bight, Botanic Ridge, Cannons Creek, Clyde, Cranbourne, Devon Meadows, Hampton Park, Junction Village, Lynbrook, and Warneet; and parts of Clyde North, Lyndhurst, Narre Warren South, Pearcedale and Tooradin.

Geography
Since 1984, federal electoral division boundaries in Australia have been determined at redistributions by a redistribution committee appointed by the Australian Electoral Commission. Redistributions occur for the boundaries of divisions in a particular state, and they occur every seven years, or sooner if a state's representation entitlement changes or when divisions of a state are malapportioned.

History

The division was created in the 1969 redistribution, and is named after Harold Holt. Holt was a long-serving minister under successive governments led by Robert Menzies. Holt became Prime Minister upon Menzies' retirement in January 1966, although Holt would only serve less than two years before disappearing off Cheviot Beach.

Historically a marginal seat, over time the seat became safer for the Australian Labor Party. However, after the 2004 election it was again highly marginal due to voter backlash over the announcement that the proposed Scoresby Freeway would be a tollway rather than a freeway. The seat returned to its safe status following the 2007 election.

Its most prominent members include Michael Duffy and Gareth Evans. Both served as ministers under Bob Hawke and Paul Keating, though Evans was a Senator during that period. Evans also served as deputy under Kim Beazley from 1996 to 1998.

Members

Election results

References

External links
 Division of Holt – Australian Electoral Commission

Electoral divisions of Australia
Constituencies established in 1969
1969 establishments in Australia
City of Casey
Electoral districts and divisions of Greater Melbourne